David Murray Peden (4 November 1946 — 12 March 1978) was a Scottish first-class cricketer.

Peden was born at Edinburgh in November 1946. A club cricketer for Fifeshire and later Stenhousemuir, Peden made his debut in first-class cricket for Scotland against Ireland at Cork in 1973. He made two further first-class appearances for Scotland, both against Ireland at Dublin in 1975 and Glasgow in 1976. With the bat, he scored 108 runs in his three first-class matches at an average of 21.60, with a highest score of 45. With his right-arm medium pace bowling, he took 2 wickets. Outside of cricket, Peden was a civil servant at Acas. He died suddenly at Dunfermline in March 1978.

References

External links
 

1946 births
1978 deaths
Cricketers from Edinburgh
Scottish cricketers
Scottish civil servants